Frauke Sonderegger is a Swiss orienteering competitor at international level. At the World Orienteering Championships in Zalaegerszeg in 1983 she placed 12th in the individual contest and fifth with the Swiss relay team. She won a bronze medal in the relay at the World Orienteering Championships in Bendigo in 1985.

References

Year of birth missing (living people)
Living people
Swiss orienteers
Female orienteers
Foot orienteers
World Orienteering Championships medalists